Jiang Qing and Her Husbands is a Chinese historical play written by Sha Yexin in 1990. The play follows Jiang Qing from a young actress in the 1930s to the most powerful Chinese woman in the 1970s, focusing on her relationships with the many men in her life including Mao Zedong. The play draws comparisons between Jiang Qing and one of her best-known acting roles, Nora in Henrik Ibsen's A Doll's House.

Owing to its highly sensitive subject, the play was banned in both mainland China and British Hong Kong. In 2010, the play was adapted by Perry Chiu Experimental Theatre and premiered in Hong Kong's Sheung Wan Civic Centre in Cantonese. Starring Perry Chiu as Jiang Qing and produced by Chiu's husband Clifton Ko, the adaptation was also successfully performed in Canada, but actually differs in content from the original. The adaptation's English title is I Am Chairman Mao's Bitch!, which derives from a famous quote by Jiang Qing during her 1980 trial (and also featured in the play): "I was Chairman Mao's dog. When he told me to bite someone, I did it."

Characters
Jiang Qing, known as Lan Ping before 1938
Tang Na, Jiang Qing's second husband
Mao Zedong, Jiang Qing's final husband
He Zizhen, Mao Zedong's third wife
Xiao Feng — Mao Zedong's personal secretary during the 1970s, Zhang Yufeng
Mao Zedong's bodyguard in Yan'an
Director Zhang (non-speaking role) — Zhang Min whom Lan Ping was rumored to have had a liaison in 1937

English translation

References

Plays by Sha Yexin
Cultural depictions of Mao Zedong
1990 plays
Plays set in the 1930s
Plays set in the 1940s
Plays set in the 1950s
Plays set in the 1960s
Plays set in the 1970s
Plays set in China
Plays based on actual events
History of China in plays
Biographical plays about politicians
Biographical plays about actors
Cultural depictions of Chinese women
Cultural depictions of actors
Works banned in China
Jiang Qing